Formula LGB Hyundai is a single seater, open wheel class of motorsport in India launched in 2006 by LGB with Hyundai the engine supplier. The cars are powered by 1.4 liter Indian built Hyundai Accent engines in the entry level JK Road Racing National Championship series. This car along with Formula LGB Swift can be considered as an Indian equivalent of Europe's Formula Ford series, where it is void of aerodynamic aids like wings. This series is one of the starter formula series to enable karting drivers step into a formula car.

Name

LGB (L.G. Balakrishnan Brothers) is named for the manufacturers of Rolon chains and sprockets, which is also the parent company of Super Speeds which designs and constructs the cars. Hyundai is named as the engine supplier.

Engine
The engine is supplied by Hyundai India Ltd.  The engine was the stock version of the 1.5 L 16-valve DOHC Alpha I4, 101 hp (75 kW) used in Indian-built Hyundai Accent Viva. The engine and gearbox are mounted in a longitudinal layout. This was also Hyundai’s first involvement into formula car racing as an engine supplier.

Chassis

The chassis is a steel space frame monocoque using square seamless steel tubes. The chassis frame design is very similar to the Formula LGB Swift frame but longer by 100 mm to improve straightline stability. Tyres are grooved racing slicks supplied by JK Tyres' motorsports division.

The exterior panels are made out of composite fire retardant fibre-reinforced plastic. The wingless front nosecone is raised at the front tip as in the new formula cars while accommodating a splitter beneath. This is to re-route the front air into the side pods while preventing under tray flow.

Costs
It is one of the cheapest formula cars in the world to race, with rental for Friday practice, Saturday qualifying and a double race on Sunday (15 laps each), costing only $800 (as of 2005). That includes tires and fuel.

Races

Races for the national championship are held at Coimbatore's Kari Motor Speedway and at Chennai's MMSC Irrugatukottai track.

The car is designed and built by Coimbatore based Super Speeds Pvt. Ltd. for LG Sports, makers of ROLON chains and sprockets, Coimbatore. The car was designed by ex-racer B. Viji (also known as B. Vijaykumar). Also JK Tyres play a major role in the series championships in tyre and driver support, while ex-formula 3 champ Akbar Ebrahim, also the boss of Team India's A1 Grand Prix, conducts a racing school to train the new drivers. The very first champion (in 2006) to emerge from this series was former karting and 2005 Formula LGB champion Reo Banajee after a closely contested season.

Endurance race class
From 2008 season the Formula LGB Hyundai races were changed to endurance format with two drivers for 50 laps including pit stop.

Champions

 * Short Sprint Race

See also
Formula LGB Swift
Formula Maruti
Formula Rolon
JK Tyre National Racing Championship

External links
Madras Motor Sports Club
Formula LGB Hyundai of Gaurav Gill

Lgb Hyundai
Indian racing cars
Hyundai Motor Company
One-make series